Belushi is an Albanian surname. Notable people with the surname include:

 John Belushi (1949–1982), American comedian, actor, and musician; older brother of James Belushi
 Jim Belushi (born 1954), American actor, comedian, and musician; younger brother of John Belushi
 Robert James Belushi (born 1980), American actor; son of James Belushi

Others
Bang Belushi, stage name of Rudolph Rinchere (born 1978), American rapper

Albanian-language surnames